Christopher Haden-Guest, 5th Baron Haden-Guest (born February 5, 1948) is an American-British screenwriter, composer, musician, director, actor, and comedian. Guest is most widely known in Hollywood for having written, directed, and starred in his series of comedy films shot in mock-documentary (mockumentary) style. Many scenes and character backgrounds in Guest's films are written and directed, although actors have no rehearsal time and the ensemble improvises scenes while filming them. The series of films began with This Is Spinal Tap (which he did not direct) and continued with Waiting for Guffman, Best in Show, A Mighty Wind,  For Your Consideration, and Mascots.

Guest holds a hereditary British peerage as the 5th Baron Haden-Guest, and has publicly expressed a desire to see the House of Lords reformed as a democratically elected chamber. Though he was initially active in the Lords, his career there was cut short by the House of Lords Act 1999, which removed the right of most hereditary peers to a seat in the parliament. When using his title, he is normally styled as Lord Haden-Guest. Guest is married to the actress and author Jamie Lee Curtis.

Early years 
Guest was born in New York City, the son of Peter Haden-Guest, a British United Nations diplomat who later became the 4th Baron Haden-Guest, and his second wife, the former Jean Pauline Hindes, an American former vice president of casting at CBS. Guest's paternal grandfather, Leslie, Baron Haden-Guest, was a Labour Party politician, who was a convert to Judaism. Guest's paternal grandmother, a descendant of the Dutch Jewish Goldsmid family, was the daughter of Colonel Albert Goldsmid, a British officer who founded the Jewish Lads' and Girls' Brigade and the Maccabaeans. Guest's maternal grandparents were Jewish emigrants from Russia. Both of Guest's parents had become atheists, and Guest himself had no religious upbringing. Nearly a decade before he was born, his uncle, David Guest, a lecturer and Communist Party member, was killed in the Spanish Civil War, fighting in the International Brigades.

Guest spent parts of his childhood in his father's native United Kingdom. He attended the High School of Music & Art (New York City), studying classical music (clarinet) at the Stockbridge School in Interlaken, Massachusetts. He later took up the mandolin, became interested in country music, and played guitar with Arlo Guthrie, a fellow student at Stockbridge School. Guest later began performing with bluegrass bands until he took up rock and roll. Guest went to Bard College for a year and then studied acting at New York University's Graduate Acting Program at the Tisch School of the Arts, graduating in 1971.

Career

1970s 
Guest began his career in theatre during the early 1970s with one of his earliest professional performances being the role of Norman in Michael Weller's Moonchildren for the play's American premiere at the Arena Stage in Washington, DC, in November 1971. Guest continued with the production when it moved to Broadway in 1972. The following year, he began making contributions to The National Lampoon Radio Hour for a variety of National Lampoon audio recordings. He both performed comic characters (Flash Bazbo—Space Explorer, Mr. Rogers, music critic Roger de Swans, and sleazy record company rep Ron Fields) and wrote, arranged, and performed numerous musical parodies (of Bob Dylan, James Taylor, and others). He was featured alongside Chevy Chase and John Belushi in the off-Broadway revue National Lampoon's Lemmings. Two of his earliest film roles were small parts as uniformed police officers in the 1972 film The Hot Rock and 1974's Death Wish.

Guest played a small role in the 1977 All in the Family episode "Mike and Gloria Meet", where in a flashback sequence Mike and Gloria recall their first blind date, set up by Michael's college buddy Jim (Guest), who dated Gloria's girlfriend Debbie (Priscilla Lopez).

Guest also had a small but important role in it Happened One Christmas, the 1977 gender-reversed TV remake of the Frank Capra classic it's a Wonderful Life, starring Marlo Thomas as Mary Bailey (the Jimmy Stewart role), with Cloris Leachman as Mary's guardian angel and Orson Welles as the villainous Mr. Potter.   Guest played Mary's brother Harry, who returned from the Army in the final scene, speaking one of the last lines of the film:  "A toast!  To my big sister Mary, the richest person in town!"

1980s 
Guest's biggest role of the first two decades of his career is likely that of Nigel Tufnel in the 1984 Rob Reiner film This Is Spinal Tap. Guest made his first appearance as Tufnel on the 1978 sketch comedy program The TV Show.

Along with Martin Short, Billy Crystal, and Harry Shearer, Guest was hired as a one-year-only cast member for the 1984–85 season on NBC's Saturday Night Live. Recurring characters on SNL played by Guest include Frankie, of Willie and Frankie (coworkers who recount in detail physically painful situations in which they have found themselves, remarking laconically "I hate when that happens"); Herb Minkman, a shady novelty toymaker with a brother named Al (played by Crystal); Rajeev Vindaloo, an eccentric foreign man in the same vein as Andy Kaufman's Latka character from Taxi; and Señor Cosa, a Spanish ventriloquist often seen on the recurring spoof of The Joe Franklin Show. He also experimented behind the camera with prefilmed sketches, notably directing a documentary-style short starring Shearer and Short as synchronized swimmers. In another short film from SNL, Guest and Crystal appear in blackface as retired Negro league baseball players, "The Rooster and the King".

He appeared as Count Rugen (the "six-fingered man") in The Princess Bride. He had a cameo role as the first customer, a pedestrian, in the 1986 musical remake of The Little Shop of Horrors, which also featured Steve Martin. As a co-writer and director, Guest made the Hollywood satire The Big Picture.

Upon his father succeeding to the family peerage in 1987, he was known as "the Hon. Christopher Haden-Guest". This was his official style and name until he inherited the barony in 1996.

1990–present 
The experience of making This is Spinal Tap directly informed the second phase of his career. Starting in 1996, Guest began writing, directing, and acting in his own series of substantially improvised films. Many of them came to be definitive examples of what came to be known as "mockumentaries"—not a term Guest appreciates in describing his unusual approach to exploring the passions that make the characters in his films so interesting. He maintains that his intention is not to mock anyone, but to explore insular, perhaps obscure communities through his method of film making.

Together, Guest, his frequent writing partner Eugene Levy, and a small band of actors have formed a loose repertory group, which appears in several films. These include Catherine O'Hara, Michael McKean, Parker Posey, Bob Balaban, Jane Lynch, John Michael Higgins, Harry Shearer, Jennifer Coolidge, Ed Begley, Jr., Jim Piddock and Fred Willard. Guest and Levy write backgrounds for each of the characters and notecards for each specific scene, outlining the plot, and then leave it up to the actors to improvise the dialogue, which is supposed to result in a much more natural conversation than scripted dialogue would. Typically, everyone who appears in these movies receives the same fee and the same portion of profits.  Among the films performed in this manner, which have been written and directed by Guest, include Waiting for Guffman (1996), about a community theatre group, Best in Show (2000), about the dog show circuit, A Mighty Wind (2001), about folk singers, For Your Consideration (2006), about the hype surrounding Oscar season, and Mascots (2016), about a sports team mascot competition.

Guest had a guest voice-over role in the animated comedy series SpongeBob SquarePants as SpongeBob's cousin, Stanley.

Guest again collaborated with Reiner in A Few Good Men (1992), appearing as Dr. Stone. In the 2000s, Guest appeared in the 2005 biographical musical Mrs Henderson Presents and in the 2009 comedy The Invention of Lying.

He is also currently a member of the musical group The Beyman Bros, which he formed with childhood friend David Nichtern and Spinal Tap's current keyboardist C. J. Vanston. Their debut album Memories of Summer as a Child was released on January 20, 2009.

In 2010, the United States Census Bureau paid $2.5 million to have a television commercial directed by Guest shown during television coverage of Super Bowl XLIV.

Guest holds an honorary doctorate from and is a member of the board of trustees for Berklee College of Music in Boston.

In 2013, Guest was the co-writer and producer of the HBO series Family Tree, in collaboration with Jim Piddock, a lighthearted story in the style he made famous in This is Spinal Tap, in which the main character, Tom Chadwick, inherits a box of curios from his great aunt, spurring interest in his ancestry.

On August 11, 2015, Netflix announced that Mascots, a film directed by Guest and co-written with Jim Piddock, about the competition for the World Mascot Association championship's Gold Fluffy Award, would debut in 2016.

Guest replayed his role as Count Tyrone Rugen in the Princess Bride Reunion on September 13, 2020.

Family 

Guest became the 5th Baron Haden-Guest, of Great Saling, in the County of Essex, when his father died in 1996. He succeeded upon the ineligibility of his older half-brother, Anthony Haden-Guest, who was born before his parents married. According to an article in The Guardian, Guest attended the House of Lords regularly until the House of Lords Act 1999 barred most hereditary peers from their seats. In the article Guest remarked:

Personal life 
Guest married actress Jamie Lee Curtis in 1984 at the home of their mutual friend Rob Reiner. They have two children, through adoption: Annie (born 1986) and Ruby (born 1996).

Guest was played by Seth Green in the film A Futile and Stupid Gesture.

Filmography

Film

Television

Recurring cast members
Guest has worked multiple times with certain actors, notably with frequent writing partner Eugene Levy, who has appeared in five of his projects. Other repeat collaborators of Guest include Fred Willard (7 projects);  Michael McKean, Bob Balaban, and Ed Begley, Jr. (6 projects each); Parker Posey, Jim Piddock, Michael Hitchcock and Harry Shearer (5 projects each); Catherine O'Hara, Larry Miller, John Michael Higgins, Jane Lynch, and Jennifer Coolidge (4 projects  each).

Awards and nominations

References

External links 

 
 
 
 "Nowt so queer as folk". The Guardian (UK). January 10, 2004. Richard Grant. Interview for release of A Mighty Wind.

1948 births
Male actors from New York City
English male comedians
English comedy musicians
English male film actors
English film directors
English male television actors
English television writers
English people of Jewish descent
English people of American descent
English people of Russian-Jewish descent
Jewish English male actors
American male comedians
21st-century American comedians
American comedy musicians
American male film actors
American male television actors
American television writers
American male television writers
American people of English descent
American people of Russian-Jewish descent
Comedy film directors
Jewish American male actors
Grammy Award winners
Living people
New York (state) Democrats
Tisch School of the Arts alumni
Jewish American male comedians
The High School of Music & Art alumni
Film directors from New York City
Screenwriters from New York (state)
Christopher
5
The Beyman Bros members
Haden-Guest